Sibyl Moholy-Nagy (born Dorothea Maria Pauline Alice Sybille Pietzsch; October 29, 1903 – January 8, 1971) was an architectural and art historian. Originally a German citizen, she accompanied her second husband, the Hungarian Bauhaus artist László Moholy-Nagy, in his move to the United States. She was the author of a study of his work, Moholy-Nagy: Experiment in Totality, plus several other books on architectural history. 

She was an outspoken critic of what she regarded as the excesses of postwar modernist architecture. After her death in 1971, fellow writer Reyner Banham eulogized her as "the most formidable of the group of lady-critics (Jane Jacobs, Ada Louise Huxtable, etc) who kept the U.S. architectural establishment continually on the run during the 50s and 60s".

Biography
Sibylle Pietzsch was born in Dresden on October 29, 1903 to architect Martin Pietzsch (Deutscher Werkbund) and Fanny (Clauss) Pietzsch. Her father also headed the Dresden Academy.

Her family was prosperous, including two older sisters and an older brother. She left her secondary education in the Municipal Lyceum at Dresden‐Neustadt at 16. She attended the graduate schools of the Universities of Leipzig and Frankfurt, but never finished a university degree.

After working at a variety of jobs (including clerical work for Leo Frobenius in 1923), she became an actress, performing on stage and in a couple of films. While performing she went under the stage name "Sibyl Peech".  In 1929, she married the Frankfurt intellectual and industrialist Carl Dreyfuss, a close friend of social philosopher Theodor Adorno.

In 1931, she left Frankfurt for Berlin, working as a scriptwriter and editor for Tobis Film Berlin. There she met the former Bauhaus professor, artist, and photographer László Moholy-Nagy (1895–1946) who was trying to get support for what would become his most famous film, A Lightplay black white gray. They became a couple by 1932, and had a daughter Hattula the next year, 1933.

Due to the rise of Nazism, László Moholy-Nagy worked for a year in Amsterdam in 1934, while Sibyl and Hattula remained in Berlin. The family reunited in London in 1935, where the couple formally married. A second daughter, Claudia, was born in 1936.

In 1937, the family emigrated to the United States, settling in Chicago. There, Moholy-Nagy assisted her husband in opening the New Bauhaus in October 1937, which was sponsored by the Association of Arts and Industries. After the New Bauhaus closed in June 1938, Moholy-Nagy helped her husband open his own school, the School of Design in Chicago in February 1939. In 1944 this school was reorganized and renamed the Institute of Design. Her husband died in November 1946 (ten years later, the Institute of Design became a department of the Illinois Institute of Technology, IIT Institute of Design). She finished copyediting her late husband's book Vision in Motion, which was published in 1947.

After her husband's death, Moholy-Nagy decided to become an architectural historian and teacher, beginning a productive career publishing many articles and books. Her writings built on knowledge from her father, and from her friendships with Walter Gropius and Sigfried Giedion, who she had met through her husband. Although she lacked formal credentials, her deep knowledge of architectural history allowed her to secure successive teaching positions in Chicago, Peoria, San Francisco, and Berkeley. 

In 1951, Moholy-Nagy was hired as associate professor of architecture history at Pratt Institute in New York City. She taught courses on such subjects as urban history and design, becoming Pratt's first female full professor in 1960. She became a respected and acclaimed teacher, a commanding classroom presence using her experiences in acting. In spite of this, she retained a secret insecurity about her lack of extensive formal university training.

Moholy-Nagy resigned in 1969 over a conflict with other faculty about the future direction of the school, then became a visiting professor at Columbia University in 1970.

Writings
Throughout the 1950s and 1960s, Moholy-Nagy had a parallel career as an architecture critic, maintaining professional relationships with such figures as  Philip Johnson and Carlos Raul Villanueva.  In 1945 she published a novel, Children's Children, under the pseudonym "S. D. Peech". In 1950 she wrote a biography of her husband, Moholy-Nagy: Experiment in Totality. 

In 1952, the Architectural League of New York awarded her an Arnold Brunner research grant to study vernacular architecture, and she subsequently produced Native Genius in Anonymous Architecture (1957), one of the first books on vernacular design for architects, calling attention to traditional buildings compatible with the natural environment. One of her most important books, Matrix of Man: An Illustrated History of Urban Environment (1968), focused on the development of cities and the influence of landscape, regional climate, tradition, culture, and form.  She made numerous contributions to architecture magazines, such as Architectural Forum and Progressive Architecture. She was one of the first critics to study postwar Latin American architecture in depth.

In her architectural writings, she was not afraid to criticize the postwar architecture of her husband's former colleagues. In 1968, she published an essay in Art in America titled "Hitler's Revenge". She started this polemic with the words:

In 1933 Hitler shook the tree and America picked up the fruit of German genius. In the best of Satanic traditions some of this fruit was poisoned, although it looked at first sight as pure and wholesome as a newborn concept. The lethal harvest was functionalism, and the Johnnies who spread the appleseed were the Bauhaus masters Walter Gropius, Mies van der Rohe, and Marcel Breuer.

Personal life
Moholy-Nagy married László Moholy-Nagy and had two daughters, Hattula (born 1933), and Claudia (1936–1971).

She died in New York City on January 8, 1971.

Awards and honors 
1953 – Arnold W. Brunner Grant, The Architectural League, New York City
1967 – John Guggenheim Fellowship, Guggenheim Foundation
1970 – American Institute "Critic of the Year"

Selected publications

 Hilde Heynen (2019). Sibyl Moholy-Nagy: Architecture, Modernism and its Discontents . London, Bloomsbury. , 9781350094116
 Children's Children (writing as S.D. Peech). New York: H. Bittner, 1945
 
 Paul Klee: Pedagogical Sketchbook (Introduction and translations). New York: Praeger, 1953 (rev. 1968)
 Native Genius In Anonymous Architecture. New York: Horizon Press, 1957.
 Carlos Raul Villanueva and the Architecture of Venezuela. New York: Praeger, 1964.
 Matrix of Man: An Illustrated History of Urban Environment. Preager, 1968
 The Architecture of Paul Rudolph. (Introduction). Praeger, 1970
 [A commentary on the proposed Grand Central Tower Project] Originally published in Art in America 56, no. 5 (September/October 1968): p42–43)

References

 Paine, Judith, "Sibyl Moholy-Nagy: A Complete Life", Archives of American Art Journal 15:4 (1975), 11–16.

External Links
Pioneering Women of American Architecture, Sibyl Moholy-Nagy

1903 births
1971 deaths
American art historians
American architectural historians
American architecture critics
German film actresses
German emigrants to the United States
American women historians
20th-century German actresses
Women art historians
20th-century American women writers
20th-century American non-fiction writers